Chaka Seisay known professionally as Chak La Rock is an American rapper, singer, songwriter, producer and DJ. He is the lead singer and founding member of urban soul rock music collective 'Frank Ernest'. He is one of Sweden's first professional hip hop artists.

Career

1987-1989
During the late 1980s and early 1990s, he formed the Stockholm based hip hop duo Sure Shot Groove with MC Stranger.

Sure Shot Groove recorded with Swemix, a hot bed for the budding musical talents that would dominate the Swedish music scene throughout the 1990s and bring American style hip hop in to the mainstream of Swedish popular music.

In 1989, Sure Shot Groove release the single We'll Never Fess and the 12 inch single Rhymes Are Flowing.

1990s 
In 1992, he appeared regularly on 'Clubhopping' a dance/hip hop music program on Swedish television network ZTV hosted by Rob'n'Raz.

In 1993, he appeared in the Daniel Fridell film 'Sökarna'.

He became a sought-after DJ in the mid-1990s organizing popular hip hop/soul and r&b clubs in Stockholm and rapidly scoring gigs around Europe.

2000s
In 2000, he co-wrote and performed backing vocals on the singel 'Friday Night Is Here' by D-Flex.

In 2008, he began a songwriting project with songwriter and bass player Nebosja 'Neb Malicious' Grujic, drummer Clemons 'C1' Mårtensson with contributions from rapper/guitarist Oliver 'Diplomatic' Hallqvist. They formed the band One. In 2009, 'The Fact Remains' the single he co-wrote and performed with One, was selected for the compilation album Groove.

In 2015, he founded urban soul rock collective Frank Ernest with Malicious. They teamed up with lead guitarist Stefan 'Grooveya' Grujic and drummer Clemons 'C1' Mårtensson began a new music project.

On September 30, 2016 Frank Ernest released their debut album 'One Time for the Mind' and the title track 'Revolution of the Mind' on iTunes and Spotify.

Discography
LPs
 Way Out (2010) by One
 One Time For The Mind (2016) by Frank Ernest

Singles
 We'll Never Fess (1989) by Sure Shot Groove
 Rhymes Are Flowin (1989) by Sure Shot Groove
 Friday Night Is Here (2009) by Dflex
 The Fact Remains (2009) by One
 Are You Ready (2010) by One
 Rings And Things (2010) by One
 Revolution of the Mind (2016) by Frank Ernest

Websites 
 Chaka Seisay @ IMDb

Frank Ernest - Official website.

Frank Ernest on iTunes

Frank Ernest on Spotify

Frank Ernest Instagram

Frank Ernest Twitter

Frank Ernest Facebook Fanpage

References

20th-century American singers
21st-century American singers
Living people
Male actors from New Rochelle, New York
Musicians from New Rochelle, New York
Singers from New York (state)
Songwriters from New York (state)
Rappers from New York (state)
21st-century American rappers
Year of birth missing (living people)